A horror host is a person who acts as the host or presenter of a program where horror films and low-budget B movies are shown on television or the Internet.  Usually the host assumes a horror-themed persona, often a campy or humorous one.  Generally there are breaks in the film where the host comments on various aspects of the movie.  Many horror host shows also include skits involving the hosts themselves, sometimes with a sidekick or other supporting characters.

History

Early hosts
The first (proto) television horror host was Vampira (Maila Nurmi). The Vampira Show featured mostly low budget suspense films, as few horror films had yet been released for television broadcast. It ran from 1954-1955 only in the Los Angeles market, but Nurmi's persona (based on cartoonist Charles Adam's "Morticia" character) would gain fame in magazines, TV, and film. In 1957, John Zacherle of Philadelphia's WCAU (and later in other markets) set the standard format for horror hosts with his "Roland" character for the station's 'Shock Theatre'. This was made possible due to RKO Pictures' new ownership licensing out the rights to its vast B-movie horror film library. Zacherle's set, style, film commentary, and special effects (such as interjecting his image into the film) were quickly emulated at local stations around the world, and as an homage today by hosts such as the nationally syndicated Svengoolie (Rich Koz). 

Hosts were often plucked from the ranks of the studio staff. In the days of live television, it was not uncommon for the weather man or booth announcer to finish a nightly news broadcast and race madly to another part of the soundstage for a quick costume change to present the evening's monster tale.

While a few early hosts like Zacherley and Vampira became the icons of this nationwide movement, most hosts were locals. The impact of these friendly revenants on their young fans cannot be overestimated. The earliest hosts are still remembered with great affection today.

Later hosts
The tradition was continued throughout the 1960s and 1970s and gained national attention in the early 1980s, after the death of L.A.'s Host, Sinister Seymour. Cassandra Peterson auditioned to become a replacement host and won the role. She became Elvira, Mistress of the Dark who is arguably the most widely recognized horror host in history. Today, two horror hosts who also started in the early 1980's dominate the genre: Rick Koz as "Svengoolie", who serves up a traditional but light-hearted weekly broadcast on MeTV; and Joe Bloom as "Joe Bob Briggs" on AMC Shudder's 'The Last Drive-In'. A journalist and B-movie film critic, Bloom's unique take on the Horror Host genre is to juxtapose deep-dive film analysis to a stereotyped redneck persona.

Notable hosts

1950s

1960s

1970s

1980s

1990s

2000s

2010s

See also
 American Scary
 Cinema Insomnia
 Creature Double Feature
 Creature Features
 Creature Features (WNEW)
 Creature Feature (WTOG)
 Horror hosts in comics

References

Further reading

External links
Horror Host Hall of Fame The official Hall of Fame for Horror Hosts of all generations. 
American Scary - Documentary: A look at the nation's tradition of horror hosting, from Zacherley to A. Ghastlee Ghoul
Horror Hosts and Creature Features Magazine A magazine dedicated to Horror Hosts and Movies.

Horror hosts
Horror movie television series
1960s American television series
1970s American television series
1980s American television series
 
Midnight movie television series
Franchised television formats